South Karo River flows through Sundergarh and Keonjhar districts and West Singhbhum in the Indian states of Odisha and Jharkhand respectively. The river flows through industrial and iron ore mining areas and Saranda forest before joining the South Koel River in Goilkera block of West Singhbhum district. As a result of its passage through the industrial and mining area the river water gets polluted.

References

Rivers of Jharkhand
Sundergarh district
Kendujhar district
Rivers of Odisha
Rivers of India